Fuensalida is a municipality located in the province of Toledo, Castile-La Mancha, Spain. According to the 2012 census (INE), the municipality has a population of 11278 inhabitants.

References

External links
Official Web Site.
Casa de Cultura de Fuensalida.

Municipalities in the Province of Toledo